ITA Award for Best Actor in a Negative Role is an award given by Indian Television Academy Awards for TV serials, to recognize a male actor who has delivered an outstanding performance in a negative role, that is in the role of an antagonist.

Winners

References 

best actor negative role
Television awards for Best Actor